Queenscliff Music Festival is a live music festival held in the town of Queenscliff, located on the Bellarine Peninsula, Victoria, Australia. The festival began in 1997 and is held annually on the last weekend of November.

According to its website, officials cite the COVID-19 pandemic as grounds for going to hiatus since 2020.

Awards and nominations

Music Victoria Awards
The Music Victoria Awards, are an annual awards night celebrating Victorian music. Best Festival commenced in 2016.

|-
| 2020
| Queenscliff Music Festival
| Best Festival
| 
|-

References

External links 
 Queenscliff Music Festival Official Site
 2005 festival photos
 2006 festival photos

Music festivals established in 1997
Music festivals in Australia
Festivals in Victoria (Australia)
Bellarine Peninsula
1997 establishments in Australia
Borough of Queenscliffe